Edward Butler (15 March 1851 – 5 January 1928) was an Australian cricketer. He played one first-class cricket match for Victoria in 1873. He also played for Tasmania and Marylebone Cricket Club. His brother, Francis, also played first-class cricket.

See also
 List of Victoria first-class cricketers
 List of Tasmanian representative cricketers

References

External links
 

1851 births
1928 deaths
Australian cricketers
Marylebone Cricket Club cricketers
Tasmania cricketers
Victoria cricketers
Cricketers from Hobart
Melbourne Cricket Club cricketers
North v South cricketers
Gentlemen cricketers